Lyman Daniel Drake (1852–1932) was an American Major League Baseball outfielder. In 1884, as a 32 year old he tried out unsuccessfully to play left field for the Cleveland Blues of the National League.  He did not make the team but in May he joined the Fort Wayne Hoosiers of the Northwestern League.  At the end of June he joined the Washington Nationals of the American Association and played 2 games for them against the Cincinnati Red Stockings. He recorded two hits in seven at-bats. Cincinnati won both games by scores of 16-0 and 16-5. Drake was then let go from the team, possibly due to defensive deficiencies.  Drake later became a superintendent for reform schools for boys, first in Missouri, then in Iowa.

References

External links

Major League Baseball outfielders
Washington Nationals (AA) players
Baseball players from Ohio
19th-century baseball players
Fort Wayne Hoosiers players
1852 births
1932 deaths